Amanda Macias is an American journalist who reports on national security subjects for CNBC.

Early life and education
Amanda Macias was born at Fort Bliss, in El Paso, Texas. Born in a military family, and has lived in Germany, South Korea, Alabama, and in Times Square, New York.

She is a 2012 graduate of the University of Missouri School of Journalism, with a degree in Broadcast Journalism and Finance.  In 2021, she was a graduate student at Columbia University and was in Knight-Bagehot Fellowship Program.

Career
Macias was a field producer in Brussels, reporting on EU political institutions and NATO. In 2013, she became a Business Insider correspondent, joining its defense industry and military team.  Prior to that, in 2008, she was an on-camera reporter for KOMU-TV in Columbia, Missouri. In August 2010, she joined Missouri Digital News.

Before March 2018, Macias was a CBS Radio web editor.  At CBS Radio, by June 2017, she was a national security reporter.

She joined CNBC's Washington office in 2018, where she covered the Pentagon.  In addition to national security, her beat includes the defense industry, State Department and the United Nations as well as the

intelligence community.

Government investigation
Macias became embroiled in the government arrest of a Pentagon counterterrorism analyst with whom she was romantically involved, according to prosecutors.  The government referred to her as "Journalist 1," and Erik Wemple of The Washington Post tied both names together, while comparing Macias to Ali Watkins.  The Wall Street Journal identified a second involved journalist as Courtney Kube, a senior reporter for NBC, whom Macias involved in the leaks.  NBC, like CNBC, is a subsidiary of NBCUniversal.

The analyst pled guilty to agreeing to disclose classified information because it would support Macias' career, which the defense described as "stalling," and was sentenced to 30 months in prison.

Personal life
In 2018, she briefly shared an apartment in Washington DC with her then boyfriend, Henry Kyle Frese, before they split and he moved to Virginia.

References

Living people
21st-century American journalists
Missouri School of Journalism alumni
People from El Paso, Texas
American women journalists
Year of birth missing (living people)
21st-century American women